Gary Elphick (born 17 October 1985) is an English footballer who is currently player-manager of Hastings United.

Career
Elphick started his career at Brighton & Hove Albion, where he made two league appearances during two seasons. He had two loan spells whilst at Brighton, joining Eastbourne Borough in September 2004 scoring only one goal in just one game before returning to the Seagulls, he later joined Conference side Aldershot Town on loan in January 2006, playing just three games.

At the end of the 2005–06 season, he was released by Brighton and signed for newly promoted Football Conference side St Albans, the club was relegated at the end of the 2006–07 season, for which he was named as Player of the Year. Whilst playing for St Albans he has played for the England National Game XI. He played 16 games for St Albans.

In his time with St Albans City he made 84 appearances and scored seven goals. Nominated for the Saints Player of the Season 2006–07, he opted to leave the side in December 2007 to join Havant & Waterlooville where he quickly became a regular in the heart of the defence, playing all but two of the remaining league games of the season and picking up two Player of the Month awards in the process.

During the 2007–08 season, Elphick joined Conference South team Havant & Waterlooville, although the player was cup-tied and therefore ineligible to play in the FA Cup third round tie away at Liverpool.

In May 2009, he joined Conference National team Eastbourne Borough.

Elphick joined Eastleigh on 20 January 2012 for an undisclosed fee. He left the club in October 2012, following squad rearrangement by newly appointed manager Richard Hill. Elphick subsequently joined Tonbridge Angels.

After a spell at Lewes, Elphick joined Worthing as joint manager with Jon Meeney in June 2015, arriving as the replacement for Adam Hinshelwood.

On 6 March 2019, Elphick joined Hastings United and become first team manager in November 2021.

Family
His younger brother, Tommy Elphick, was also a professional footballer.

References

http://bhtfc.co.uk/first-team/players/

External links

1985 births
English footballers
Association football defenders
Brighton & Hove Albion F.C. players
Aldershot Town F.C. players
St Albans City F.C. players
Havant & Waterlooville F.C. players
Eastbourne Borough F.C. players
Eastleigh F.C. players
Tonbridge Angels F.C. players
Lewes F.C. players
Worthing F.C. players
Hastings United F.C. players
Hastings United F.C. managers
Living people
National League (English football) players